Cagarral is a mountain in the northeastern part of the island of Sal in Cape Verde. It is located near the east coast, 2 km northeast of Pedra de Lume and 6 km east of the island capital Espargos. To its east is the headland Ponta Trás de Cagarral. Together with the mountain and the saltpans to the west, it is a protected area as a protected landscape.

References

Mountains of Cape Verde
Geography of Sal, Cape Verde
Protected areas of Cape Verde